Leonid Fyodorovich Serebrennikov (October 2, 1947, Moscow) is a Soviet and Russian actor and a singer. His voice appeared in approximately 70 films.

Performer of the song Absurdly, jokingly, blindly, madly, fairy... (Nelepo, smeshno, bezrassudno, bezumno, volshebno...) from a popular 1978 Soviet film An Ordinary Miracle, Just Imagine (Predstavte Sebe) from 1982 film Charodei.

He was the host of several television programs.

References

External links 
 

1947 births
Living people
Male actors from Moscow
Singers from Moscow
Soviet male singers
Soviet male actors
Soviet television presenters
Russian television presenters
Honored Artists of the Russian Federation
20th-century Russian male singers
20th-century Russian singers